Sarah Evelyn Habel (born July 30, 1982) is an American actress. She is best known for playing the roles of Daphne Glover in the MTV television series Underemployed and Geraldine Grundy in The CW television series Riverdale.

Early life
Habel was born in Michigan, USA and attended Michigan State University where she received her Bachelor of Arts in Theater in 2004.

Career
After graduating from university Habel pursued theater in London and New York City as well as performing with the Wild Swan Children's Theater. Habel made her movie debut in Drew Barrymore's Whip It alongside Elliot Page.

Filmography

Film

Television

References

External links

1982 births
Actresses from Michigan
Living people
Place of birth missing (living people)
Michigan State University alumni
21st-century American actresses
American film actresses
American stage actresses
American television actresses